Zarnaq (also known as Zaraq, Zarnā, and Zerna) is a city in the Central District of Heris County, East Azerbaijan province, Iran. At the 2006 census, its population was 4,766 in 1,132 households. The following census in 2011 counted 5,713 people in 1,548 households. The latest census in 2016 showed a population of 5,343 people in 1,649 households. The city's inhabitants are from Oghuz Turks and speak Azerbaijani Turkic.

References 

Heris County

Cities in East Azerbaijan Province

Populated places in East Azerbaijan Province

Populated places in Heris County